Preah Vihear Municipality (Krong Preah Vihear) is a municipality located in Preah Vihear Province in northern Cambodia. The provincial capital Preah Vihear is located in the municipality.

Administration

Notes

Districts of Preah Vihear province